The following is a list of notable deaths in April 1996.

Entries for each day are listed alphabetically by surname. A typical entry lists information in the following sequence:
 Name, age, country of citizenship at birth, subsequent country of citizenship (if applicable), reason for notability, cause of death (if known), and reference.

April 1996

1
Masroor Anwar, 51, Indian poet, lyricist and screenwriter.
Alexandru Diordiță, 84, Soviet/Moldovan politician.
Myroslav Dumanskyi, 66, Ukrainian football player.
Jean Le Moyne, 83, Canadian politician.
John McSherry, 51, American baseball umpire, heart attack.
Alfredo Nobre da Costa, 72, Portuguese politician.
Léon Pétillon, 92, Belgian politician.

2
Jean Elizabeth Hampton, 41, American political philosopher and author.
Lindsay Hartwig, 76, Australian politician.
Ian Mitchell, 49, Scottish football player.
Antonio Ortiz Ramírez, 88, Spanish anarcho-syndicalist and anarchist.

3
Ron Brown, 54, American government official, aircraft crash.
Frank Doyle, 78, American comic book writer (Archie), cancer.
Herk Harvey, 71, American actor and director, pancreatic cancer.
Jo Privat, 76, French musician, cancer.
Alphonse James Schladweiler, 93, American prelate of the Roman Catholic Church.
Carl Stokes, 68, American politician and diplomat, esophageal cancer.

4
Brian Abel-Smith, 69, British economist.
Barney Ewell, 78, American track and field athlete and Olympic champion.
Zita Perczel, 77, Hungarian actress.
Winifred Shotter, 91, British actress.

5
Monika Dannemann, 50, German figure skater and painter, suicide.
Gerry L'Estrange, 78, Irish politician.
Charlene Holt, 67, American actress (El Dorado).
Jac Maris, 96, Dutch sculptor.
Ahmed Mekkawi, 73, Egyptian football player.
Herta Worell, 83, German actress.

6
John D. Bulkeley, 84, United States Navy vice admiral and Medal of Honor recipient.
Ester Carloni, 98, Italian actress.
Greer Garson, 91, British-American actress (Mrs. Miniver, Blossoms in the Dust, Madame Curie), Oscar winner (1943), heart failure.
Sterling M. McMurrin, 82, American theologian.

7
Colleen Clifford, 97, Australian actress.
Georges Géret, 71, French film actor, cancer.
Berkely Mather, 87, British writer.
Yelena Mazanik, 82, Soviet/Belarus partisan who assassinated Nazi official Wilhelm Kube.

8
Donald Adams, 67, English opera singer and actor, brain cancer.
John Hudson, 77, American actor (Gunfight at the O.K. Corral, The Screaming Skull, G.I. Blues).
George W. Jenkins, 88, American businessman and philanthropist.
Ben Johnson, 77, American actor (The Last Picture Show, The Wild Bunch, The Sugarland Express), Oscar winner (1972), heart attack.
León Klimovsky, 89, Argentine film director, screenwriter and actor.
Petko Sirakov, 67, Bulgarian wrestler.
Agron Sulaj, 44, Albanian football player and.
José Valdivieso, 74, Argentine football player and manager.
Petro Voinovsky, 82, Ukrainian nationalist.
Mick Young, 59, Australian politician.

9
Sandy Becker, 74, American announcer, actor, and comedian.
Richard Condon, 81, American political novelist.
Paul Leder, 70, American actor and film director, lung cancer.
Otto Licha, 83, Austrian handball player.
James Rouse, 81, American businessman and founder of The Rouse Company.

10
Moshe Davis, 80, American rabbi.
Walter Harding, 79, American scholar and professor of English literature.
Herman Pines, 94, Russian-American chemist.
Jack Wilkinson, 64, English football player.

11
Billy Anderson, 55, American gridiron football player (Tennessee Titans), ALS.
Hans Beck, 84, Norwegian ski jumper.
Marcel Bleustein-Blanchet, 89, French businessman and publicist.
Trygve Brodahl, 90, Norwegian cross country skier.
Mel Hill, 82, Canadian ice hockey player.
Wanda McKay, 80, American actor and model.

12
Antonio Capua, 90, Italian politician.
Helmut Krone, 70, American art director.
Marthe Robert, 82, French writer.
Igor Ternov, 74, Russian physicist.

13
C. Alfred "Chief" Anderson, 89, American aviator.
George Mackay Brown, 74, Scottish poet, author and dramatist.
James Burke, 64, American mobster and Lucchese crime family associate, lung cancer.
D'Arcy Coulson, 88, Canadian ice hockey player.
Vjekoslav Kaleb, 90, Croatian writer.
Denis Sargan, 71, British econometrician.

14
Waleed Al-Salam, 69, Iraqi mathematician.
Gaylord Birch, 50, American musician.
Marie Clotilde Bonaparte, 84, French princess of the Bonaparte dynasty.
William K. Everson, 67, American journalist, prostate cancer.
Mervyn Levy, 82, Welsh artist and writer on art.
George N. Neise, 79, American actor, cancer.
James Sargent Russell, 93, United States Navy admiral.

15
Beatriz Costa, 88, Portuguese actress.
John C. Flanagan, 90, American psychologist.
Arthur Lelyveld, 83, American rabbi and activist.
Stavros Niarchos, 86, Greek businessman and art collector, pneumonia.

16
George Abel, 80, Canadian ice hockey player and Olympic champion.
Tomás Gutiérrez Alea, 67, Cuban film director and screenwriter.
François-Régis Bastide, 69, French writer, diplomat, politician, and radio host, lung cancer.
Lucille Bremer, 79, American actress and dancer, heart attack.
Irasema Dilián, 71, Italian actress.
Raymond Hill, 62, American tenor saxophonist, singer, and recording artist.
Charlie Hillard, 58, American aerobatics pilot, aviation accident.

17
Paul Bleiß, 91, German politician and member of the Bundestag.
Piet Hein, 90, Danish puzzle designer, mathematician, and poet.
Adelaide Lambert, 88, American swimmer and Olympic champion.
Dudley Manlove, 81, American actor and radio announcer.
Abbot Low Moffat, 94, American politician, cancer.
Hugh Robson, 77, New Zealand lawn bowls competitor.

18
Brook Berringer, 22, American gridiron football player, plane crash.
Bernard Edwards, 43, American bass player and record producer, pneumonia.
Mike Leander, 54, English arranger, songwriter and record producer, cancer.
Hubert Opperman, 91, Australian racing cyclist.

19
Yukiyoshi Aoki, 61, Japanese swimmer.
James B. Clark Jr., 39, American murderer, execution by lethal injection.
Ken Doherty, 90, American decathlete.
John Martin, 36, English spree killer, suicide.
Buddy Oldfield, 84, English cricket player and umpire.

20
John Barrie, 71, English snooker player.
Hank Biasatti, 74, Canadian basketball player.
Alexander D'Arcy, 87, Egyptian actor.
Frans Gommers, 79, Belgian football player.
Raúl Meraz, 69, Mexican actor.
Christopher Robin Milne, 75, English author and bookseller.
Steve Oneschuk, 65, Canadian football player.
Tran Van Tra, 78, Vietnamese general and commander in the Viet Cong.

21
Zora Arkus-Duntov, 86, Belgian-American engineer nicknamed the "Father of the Corvette.".
Dzhokhar Dudayev, 52, Soviet/Russian general and Chechen leader, homicide.
Alceo Galliera, 85, Italian conductor and composer.
Robert Hersant, 76, French newspaper magnate.
Abdul Hafeez Kardar, 71, Indian cricket player.
Luigi Pistilli, 66, Italian actor, suicide.
Paraone Reweti, 79, New Zealand politician and rātana morehu.
Jimmy Snyder, 77, American horse racing announcer & television sports announcer, heart attack.
Bertel Storskrubb, 78, Finnish middle-distance runner, hurdler and Olympian.

22
Erma Bombeck, 69, American humorist and writer, kidney disease.
Helen Keane, 73, American jazz record producer, breast cancer.
Molly Keane, 91, Irish writer.
Jug McSpaden, 87, American golfer, and golf course architect, accidental carbon monoxide poisoning.
Hiteswar Saikia, 62, Indian politician, kidney failure.
Serafim Subbotin, 75, Soviet/Russian flying ace.
John Baptist Wolf, 88, American historian, specializing in modern European history.
Nobuo Yoneda, 66, Japanese computer scientist.

23
Jean Victor Allard, 82, Canadian general.
Mario Luigi Ciappi, 86, Italian Cardinal of the Roman Catholic Church.
María Lavalle Urbina, 87, Mexican lawyer and politician.
P. L. Travers, 96, Australian-British novelist (Mary Poppins), epilepsy.
Jesús Hernández Úbeda, 36, Spanish bicycle racer.

24
Donald Cammell, 62, British film director, suicide.
Giliante D'Este, 86, Italian rower.
Tomás de Bhaldraithe, 79, Irish language scholar and lexicographer.
Gary Geiger, 59, American baseball player, cirrhosis.
Preston Lockwood, 83, British actor.
Aldo Masciotta, 86, Italian fencer.
Rafael Orozco, 50, Spanish musician, AIDS-related complications.
Frank Riley, 80, American writer.
Vincenzo Torriani, 77, Italian sports executive and director of the Giro d'Italia.

25
Saul Bass, 75, American graphic designer and filmmaker, lymphoma.
John Lorne Campbell, 89, British historian.
Althea Henley, 84, American film actress and dancer.
Dick Wesson, 73, American actor, comedian, comedy writer, and producer, aortic aneurysm.
Harold Alden Wheeler, 92, American electrical engineer.

26
Wolfgang Franz, 90, German mathematician.
Milt Gaston, 100, American baseball player.
Guido Leontini, 69, Italian actor.
Stirling Silliphant, 78, American screenwriter (In the Heat of the Night, The Towering Inferno, The Poseidon Adventure) and film producer.
Burton Stein, 70, American Indologist.

27
William Colby, 76, American intelligence agent, drowning.
Gilles Grangier, 84, French film director and screenwriter.
Adam Roarke, 58, American actor and film director, heart attack.
Rudolf Schulten, 72, German physicist.
Joan Sterndale-Bennett, 82, British actress.

28
Al Hollingsworth, 88, American baseball player.
Svea Holst, 95, Swedish film actress.
Orville Prescott, 89, American literary critic (The New York Times).
Tien Soeharto, 72, wife of the Indonesian president, Suharto
Lester Sumrall, 83, American minister.

29
Mario David, 68, French actor, pulmonary embolism.
Ray Kinsella, 85, Canadian ice hockey player.
Claude Overton, 68, American basketball player.
François Picard, 75, French racing driver.

30
Jeanne Bal, 67, American actress and model, breast cancer.
Juan Hohberg, 69, Argentine-Uruguayan football player and coach.
Dezső Keresztury, 91, Hungarian politician.
Julio César Méndez Montenegro, 80, President of Guatemala.
David Opatoshu, 78, American actor (Exodus, Torn Curtain, Dr. Kildare).
Rosaura Revueltas, 85, Mexican actress, dancer, and author, lung cancer.

References 

1996-04
 04